Welcome to the Future is a music festival held annually in the Netherlands, near Amsterdam. It was launched in 2007 in the nature reserve Het Twiske near Amsterdam. In 2015, the first indoor day edition was launched in the Warehouse Elementenstraat. The final edition at the Twiske area occurred in 2022.

Awards 
Since 2012 the festival has been rewarded with A Greener Festival award, and since 2014 with their highest rating.

Line up

References 

Music festivals in the Netherlands
July events